Lauri Wilskman (14 May 1887 – 25 November 1937) was a Finnish track and field athlete, who competed at the 1908 Summer Olympics.

Athletics 

He was a founding member and chairman of the club Viipurin Akateemiset Urheilijat, and also represented the club Viipurin Reipas.

Other 

He was born to father hovioikeudenneuvos Oscar Waldemar Wilskman (1851–1918) and mother Hanna Augusta Svahn (1861–1932) in Vyborg in 1887. He married Ilme Seppälä in 1916. Their daughter Liisa Ester Vaartaja married Eino Hirva in 1940.

He and Ivar Wilskman were first cousins once removed.

Wilskman graduated as a forester in 1911 and worked in forestry up to his death.

Wilskman fought in the Finnish Civil War.

Wilskman died in Nurmijärvi in 1937.

Sources 

1887 births
1937 deaths
People from Viipuri Province (Grand Duchy of Finland)
Finnish male discus throwers
Finnish male high jumpers
Olympic athletes of Finland
Athletes (track and field) at the 1908 Summer Olympics
Olympic male high jumpers